Barbara L. Osofsky (born 1937) is a retired professor of mathematics at Rutgers University. Her research concerns abstract algebra.  Osofsky's contributions to mathematics include her characterization of semisimple rings in terms of properties of cyclic modules.  Osofsky also established a logical equivalence between the continuum hypothesis and statements about the global dimension of associative rings.

Career
Osofsky received her Ph.D. from Rutgers University in 1964. She then worked at Rutgers until 2004, when she retired. She served as acting chair of the Rutgers mathematics department in 1978.

Awards and honors
In 1973, Osofsky addressed a national meeting of the AMS. She was the first woman in 50 years to do so. She became the first female editor of an AMS journal in 1974 when she became the editor of Proceedings of the American Mathematical Society.

From 2000 to 2002, Osofsky served as First Vice-President of the Mathematical Association of America. In 2005, she was awarded the MAA meritorious service award.

In 2012, Osofsky became a fellow of the American Mathematical Society.

Selected publications
  Osofsky, B. L. A generalization of quasi-Frobenius rings. J. Algebra 4 1966 373–387.
Osofsky, B. L. Rings all of whose finitely generated modules are injective. Pacific J. Math. 14 1964 645–650.
Osofsky, Barbara L.; Smith, Patrick F. Cyclic modules whose quotients have all complement submodules direct summands. J. Algebra 139 (1991), no. 2, 342–354.

References

Living people
1937 births
American women mathematicians
20th-century American mathematicians
21st-century American mathematicians
Algebraists
Fellows of the American Mathematical Society
Rutgers University alumni
Rutgers University faculty
20th-century women mathematicians
21st-century women mathematicians
20th-century American women
21st-century American women